Calera Creek (Pacifica, California) is a stream in the Rockaway Beach and Vallemar neighborhoods of Pacifica, California.  The creek is named for the limestone deposits and historical quarry located nearby. With headwaters in the Sweeney Ridge national park, this creek presently enjoys wetlands restoration from the Calera Creek Water Recycling Plant, and contains habitat for the California Red-legged Frog and San Francisco Garter Snake.

References

See also
List of watercourses in the San Francisco Bay Area

Pacifica, California
Rivers of San Mateo County, California
Rivers of Northern California